Hunayn ibn Ishaq al-Ibadi (also Hunain or Hunein) ((809–873) was an influential Nestorian Christian translator, scholar, physician, and scientist. During the apex of the Islamic Abbasid era, he worked with a group of translators, among whom were Abū 'Uthmān al-Dimashqi, Ibn Mūsā al-Nawbakhti, and Thābit ibn Qurra, to translate books of philosophy and classical Greek and Persian texts into Arabic and Syriac.

Ḥunayn ibn Isḥaq was the most productive translator of Greek medical and scientific treatises in his day. He studied Greek and became known as the "Sheikh of the translators". He mastered four languages: Arabic, Syriac, Greek and Persian. Hunayn's method was widely followed by later translators. He was originally from al-Hira, the capital of a pre-Islamic cultured Arab kingdom, but he spent his working life in Baghdad, the center of the great ninth-century Greek-into-Arabic/Syriac translation movement. His fame went far beyond his own community.

Overview
In the Abbasid era, a new interest in extending the study of Greek science had arisen. At that time, there was a vast amount of untranslated ancient Greek literature pertaining to philosophy, mathematics, natural science, and medicine. This valuable information was only accessible to a very small minority of Middle Eastern scholars who knew the Greek language; the need for an organized translation movement was urgent.

In time, Hunayn ibn Ishaq became arguably the chief translator of the era, and laid the foundations of Islamic medicine. In his lifetime, ibn Ishaq translated 116 works, including Plato's Timaeus, Aristotle's Metaphysics, and the Old Testament, into Syriac and Arabic. Ibn Ishaq also produced 36 of his own books, 21 of which covered the field of medicine. His son Ishaq, and his nephew Hubaysh, worked together with him at times to help translate. Hunayn ibn Ishaq is known for his translations, his method of translation, and his contributions to medicine. He has also been suggested by François Viré to be the true identity of the Arabic falconer Moamyn, author of De Scientia Venandi per Aves. Hunayn Ibn Ishaq was a translator at the House of Wisdom, Bayt al-Hikma, where he received his education. In the West, another name he is known by his Latin name, Joannitius. It was the translations that came from administrative and legal materials gathered that lead to understanding of how to build up Arabic as the new official language.

Early life
Hunayn ibn Ishaq was an Arab Nestorian Christian, born in 809, during the Abbasid period, in al-Hirah, to an ethnic Arab family. Hunayn in classical sources is said to have belonged to the ʿIbad, thus his nisba "al-Ibadi. The ʿIbad was an Arab community composed of different Arab tribes that had once converted to Nestorian Christianity and lived in al-Hira. They were known for their high-literacy and multilingualism being fluent in Syriac, their liturgical and cultural language, besides their native-Arabic.

As a child, he learned the Syriac and Arabic languages. Although al-Hira was known for commerce and banking, and his father was a pharmacist, Hunayn went to Baghdad in order to study medicine. In Baghdad, Hunayn had the privilege to study under renowned physician Yuhanna ibn Masawayh; however, Hunayn's countless questions irritated Yuhanna, causing him to scold Hunayn and forcing him to leave. Hunayn promised himself to return to Baghdad when he became a physician. He went abroad to master the Greek language. On his return to Baghdad, Hunayn displayed his newly acquired skills by reciting the works of Homer and Galen. In awe, ibn Masawayh reconciled with Hunayn, and the two started to work cooperatively.

Hunayn was extremely motivated in his work to master Greek studies, which enabled him to translate Greek texts into Syriac and Arabic. The Abbasid Caliph al-Mamun noticed Hunayn's talents and placed him in charge of the House of Wisdom, the Bayt al Hikmah. The House of Wisdom was an institution where Greek works were translated and made available to scholars. (Sylvain Gougenheim argued, though, that there is no evidence of Hunayn being in charge of the Bayt al Hikmah) The caliph also gave Hunayn the opportunity to travel to Byzantium in search of additional manuscripts, such as those of Aristotle and other prominent authors.

Accomplishments
In Hunayn ibn Ishaq's lifetime, he devoted himself to working on a multitude of writings; both translations and original works.

As a writer of original work
Hunayn wrote on a variety of subjects that included philosophy, religion and medicine. In "How to Grasp Religion", Hunayn explains the truths of religion that include miracles not possibly made by humans and humans' incapacity to explain facts about some phenomena, and false notions of religion that include depression and an inclination for glory. He also worked on Arabic grammar and lexicography, writing a unique grammar of the Arabic language titled "The Rules of Inflexion According to the System of the Greeks."

Ophthalmology

Hunayn ibn Ishaq enriched the field of ophthalmology. His developments in the study of the human eye can be traced through his innovative book, "Book of the Ten Treatises of the Eye". This textbook is the first known systematic treatment of this field and was most likely used in medical schools at the time. Throughout the book, Hunayn explains the eye and its anatomy in minute detail; its diseases, their symptoms, their treatments. Hunain repeatedly emphasized that he believed the crystalline lens to be in the center of the eye.  Hunain may have been the originator of this idea.  The idea of the central crystalline lens was widely believed from Hunain's period through the late 1500s.
He discusses the nature of cysts and tumors, and the swelling they cause. He discusses how to treat various corneal ulcers through surgery, and the therapy involved in repairing cataracts. "Ten Treatises on Ophthalmology" demonstrates the skills Hunayn ibn Ishaq had not just as a translator and a physician, but also as a surgeon.

As a physician
Hunayn ibn Ishaq's reputation as a scholar and translator, and his close relationship with Caliph al-Mutawakkil, led the caliph to name Hunayn as his personal physician, ending the exclusive use of physicians from the Bukhtishu family. Despite their relationship, the caliph became distrustful; at the time, there were fears of death from poisoning, and physicians were well aware of its synthesis procedure. The caliph tested Hunayn's ethics as a physician by asking him to formulate a poison, to be used against a foe, in exchange for a large sum. Hunayn ibn Ishaq repeatedly rejected the Caliph's generous offers, saying he would need time to develop a poison. Disappointed, the caliph imprisoned his physician for a year. When asked why he would rather be killed than make the drug, Hunayn explained the physician's oath required him to help, and not harm, his patients.  He completed many different medical works that pushed the idea of treating medicine with the practice and art of physic treatments. Some of his medical works were pulled from Greek sources such as, Fi Awja al-Ma'idah (On Stomach Ailments) and al-Masail fi’l-Tibb li’l-Muta’allimin (Questions on Medicine for Students) and having these sources to drawn on keeps the original text clear.

As a translator
With the construction of the House of Wisdom, the Abbasid Caliph al Ma'mun wanted to have a place to gather world knowledge from Muslim and non-Muslim educators. Hunayn ibn Ishaq was one of the most well-known translators at the institution and was called "the sheikh of the translators, as he mastered the four principal languages of the time: Greek, Persian, Arabic, and Syriac. He was able to translate compositions on philosophy, astronomy, mathematics, medicine, and even in subjects such as magic and oneiromancy. Nonetheless, none of his extant translations credit the House of Wisdom, which questions the legitimacy of whether this place actually was the origin of the Translation Movement.

Some of Hunayn's most notable translations were his rendering of "De materia Medica", a pharmaceutical handbook, and his most popular selection, "Questions on Medicine", a guide for novice physicians. Information was presented in the form of questions taken from Galen's "Art of Physic" and answers, which are based on "Summaria Alexandrinorum". For instance, Hunayn explains what the four elements and the four humors are and that medicine divides into therapy and practice and also defines health, disease, neutrality, and as well as the natural and the contranatural, and the six necessary conditions of living healthily.

Hunayn translated writings on agriculture, stones, and religion and also some of Plato's and Aristotle's works, in addition to commentaries. He also translated many medicinal texts and summaries, mainly those of Galen, such as Galen's "On Sects" and "On the Anatomy of the Veins and Arteries". His translations are some of the only remaining documents of Greek manuscripts, and he helped influence the art of medicine, and through his book al-’Ashar Maqalat fi’l-Ayn (The Ten Treatises on the Eye) he helped to expand the science of ophthalmology through theory and practice.

Many R. Duval's published works on chemistry represent translations of Hunayn's work. Also in Chemistry a book titled ['An Al-Asma'] meaning "About the Names", did not reach researchers but was used in "Dictionary of Ibn Bahlool" of the 10th century.

Translation techniques
In his efforts to translate Greek material, Hunayn ibn Ishaq was accompanied by his son Ishaq ibn Hunayn and his nephew Hubaysh. Hunayn would translate Greek into Syriac, and then he would have his nephew finish by translating the text from Syriac to Arabic, after which he then would seek to correct any of his partners' mistakes or inaccuracies he might find. </ref>

Unlike many translators in the Abbasid period, he largely did not try to follow the text's exact lexicon. Instead, he would try to summarize the topics of the original texts and then in a new manuscript paraphrase it in Syriac or Arabic. He also edited and redacted the available texts of technical works by comparing the information included therein with other works on similar subjects. Thus, his renditions may be seen as interpretations of medical, astronomical, and philosophical texts after researching the topics over which they range. Some scholars argue Hunayn's approach differed from previous translators through his commentaries on the subject and was influenced by Galen's ideas along the way.

Selected translations
"Kitab ila Aglooqan fi Shifa al Amraz" – This Arabic translation, related to Galen's Commentary, by Hunayn ibn Ishaq, is extant in the Library of Ibn Sina Academy of Medieval Medicine and Sciences. It is a masterpiece of all the literary works of Galen. It is part of the Alexandrian compendium of Galen's work. This manuscript from the 10th century is in two volumes that include details regarding various types of fevers (Humyat) and different inflammatory conditions of the body. More importantly, it includes details of more than 150 single and compound formulations of both herbal and animal origin. The book also provides an insight into understanding the traditions and methods of treatment in the Greek (Unani) and Roman eras.
De sectis
Ars medica
De pulsibus ad tirones
Ad Glauconem de medendi methodo
De ossibus ad tirones
De musculorum dissectione
De nervorum dissectione
De venarum arteriumque dissectione
De elementis secundum Hippocratem
De temperamentis
De facultibus naturalibus
De causis et symptomatibus
De locis affectis De pulsibus (four treatises)
De typis (febrium)
De crisibus
De diebus decretoriis
Methodus medendi
Hippocrates and Dioscorides.

Works
Kitab Adab al-Falasifa, original Arabic lost, known in medieval translation
Libro de Los Buenos Proverbios (Castilian Spanish)
Sefer Musré ha-Filosofim (Book of the Morals of the Philosophers), Hebrew translation of the Judeo-Andalusian poet, Juda ben Shlomo Al-Jarisi (1170–1235).

Fragments from Various Books Interpolated or Adapted
General History of Alfonso el Sabio (Castilian Spanish)
Llibre de Saviesa of James of Aragon (Castilian Spanish)
The Pseudo Seneca (Castilian Spanish)
La Floresta de Philosophos (Castilian Spanish)
El Victorial (Castilian Spanish)
Bocados de Oro, taken directly from Adab al-Falasifa.(Spanish)

Other translated works 

Plato's Republic (Siyasah).
Aristotle's Categories (Maqulas), Physics (Tabi'iyat) and Magna Moralia (Khulqiyat).
Seven books of Galen's anatomy, lost in the original Greek, preserved in Arabic.
Arabic version of the Old Testament from the Greek Septuagint did not survive.
"Kitab Al-Ahjar" or the "Book of Stones".

See also
Book of the Ten Treatises of the Eye (book)
 Ishaq ibn Hunayn, Hunayn ibn Ishaq's son, also a translator and physician
 Galen § Influence on Islamic medicine
 History of medicine

Citations

References 

 
 
 Hunain ibn Ishaq, My Syriac and Arabic translations of Galen, ed. G. Bergstrasser with German translation, Leipzig (1925) (in German and Arabic)
 Eastwood, Bruce."The Elements of Vision: The Micro-Cosmology of Galenic Visual Theory"Books.Google.com

Further reading 

 Brock, Sebastian P., Changing Fashions in Syriac Translation Technique: The Background to Syriac Translations under the Abbasids, Journal of the Canadian Society for Syriac Studies 4 (2004): 3–14.
 Brock, Sebastian P., The Syriac Background to Hunayn’s Translation Techniques, ARAM 3 (1991 [1993]): 139–162.
 Cooper, Glen M., Ḥunayn ibn Isḥāq’s Galen Translations and Greco-Arabic Philology: Some Observations from the Crises (De crisibus) and the Critical Days (De diebus decretoriis), Oriens 44 (2016): 1–43.
 
 Eksell, Kerstin, Pragmatic Markers from Greek into Arabic: A Case Study on Translations by Isḥāq ibn Ḥunayn, Studia graeco-arabica 5 (2015): 321–344.
 Faiq, Said. "Medieval Arabic translation: A cultural consideration." Mediaevalia 26.2 (2005): 99–110.
 
 
 Healy, J. "The Syriac-Speaking Christians and the Translation of Greek Science into Arabic." Muslim Heritage (2006).
 Johna, Samir. "Marginalisation of ethnic and religious minorities in Middle East history of medicine: the forgotten contributions to Arabian and Islamic medicine and science." Acta Medico-Historica Adriatica 8.2 (2010): 203–210.
 
 
 Osman, Ghada. "The sheikh of the translators." The Sociological Turn in Translation and Interpreting Studies 66 (2014): 41.
 Rashed, Roshdi. "Problems of the transmission of Greek scientific thought into Arabic: Examples from mathematics and optics." History of science 27.2 (1989): 199–209.

External links
 Hunain ibn Ishaq, On How to Discern the Truth of Religion – English translation
 Aprim, Fred "Hunein Ibn Ishak – (809–873 or 877)"

 Bibliography of works on Hunain ibn Ishaq from the Hebrew University of Jerusalem

809 births
873 deaths
9th-century Arabs
9th-century people from the Abbasid Caliphate
9th-century mathematicians
9th-century philosophers
9th-century physicians
9th-century translators
Mathematicians from the Abbasid Caliphate
Arab Christians
Greek–Syriac translators
Greek–Arabic translators
Iraqi Christians
Members of the Assyrian Church of the East
Nestorians in the Abbasid Caliphate
Opticians of the medieval Islamic world
Syriac–Arabic translators
Physicians from the Abbasid Caliphate